The Klasop or Klasof is a river in the northwest of the Bird's Head Peninsula of New Guinea. Its course generally runs in a southerly direction, and it flows into the bay of Segun, in a large estuary that is connected to that of the Klasagun River to the west. The large island of Jemur separates the two estuaries. The stream of Klawaralim is a left tributary in the upper reach, while in the lower reaches Klasop is joined by a number of right-hand tributaries, including Klamer and Klasafet. For much of its length, Klasop is surrounded by mangrove forests.

Sources 
 

Rivers of Southwest Papua 
Rivers of Indonesia